Sirindhornia chaipattana is a species of moth of the family Tortricidae. It is found in Thailand. The habitat consist of secondary forests.

The length of the forewings is about 5.2 mm for males and 4.9–5.3 mm for females. The basal two-fifths of the forewings is white with several slender, connected black lines and spots and a distal white band with only few irregular black dots. The distal three-fifths of the forewings is reddish orange. The hindwings are dark grey to blackish with a narrow orange patch along the termen, an orange patch in the center and a whitish to orange streak in the anal region.

Etymology
The species name refers to the Chaipattana Foundation which supports the Ang-Ed community forest.

References

Moths described in 2014
Enarmoniini